Sigilliclystis kendricki is a moth in the family Geometridae. It is found in Hong Kong and probably inland China.

The length of the forewings is about 9 mm for males and 10 mm for females. Adults have a grey-brown ground colour with a light suffusion of red scales at the base of the forewing and costa. Both the fore- and hindwings are lightly dusted with brown scales.

Etymology
The species is named in honour of Roger Kendrick, in recognition of the work he has done on Hong Kong moths.

References

Moths described in 1999
Eupitheciini